Ciarán Murray is a former Gaelic footballer who played at senior level for the Monaghan county team.

Playing career
Murray helped Monaghan to victory in the 1984–85 National Football League Final defeating Armagh. He collected two Ulster Senior Football Championship medals in 1985, beating Derry and again in 1988, defeating Tyrone in Clones. He claimed an All-Star Award for his efforts in 1985. He played for Ireland in the 1986 and 1987 International Rules Series against Australia. In 1991, he retired from football due to persistent knee injuries. Murray acted as physio to the Republic of Ireland national football team in the 2002 FIFA World Cup and was seen on TV embracing Mick McCarthy following Robbie Keane's late, late equaliser against Germany.

References

Year of birth missing (living people)
Living people
Irish physiotherapists
Monaghan inter-county Gaelic footballers
St Tighernach's Gaelic footballers
Republic of Ireland at the 2002 FIFA World Cup